Vasili Nechitailo (1915–1980) was a Soviet Socialist realist artist from Salsk in the Kuban region of Russia who studied art in Moscow.

He is known for "heroic propaganda of the Stalinist era – huge paintings like Glory to the Great Stalin (1950) by Yury Kugagh, Vasily Nechitailo and Victor Tsyplakov".

A retrospective exhibit in Minnesota, USA, described his work:  "He is recognized for his remarkable artistic style-Nechitailo’s innate sense of color and unique color solutions were acclaimed by his fellow artists and as well as art critics. Throughout his career, his native Kuban retained an irresistible fascination for him and he frequently traveled from Moscow to southern Russia to portray the vastness of freshly ploughed fields and dazzling golden mountains of harvested wheat shoveled by sunburnt collective farmers. His bold and lavish brushstrokes are highly expressive and the interplay of pictorial elements often dominates the subject matter. Nechitailo’s great mastery in conveying spontaneous and unsentimental beauty through his virtuoso use of paint has made him one of the most renowned Russian artists of the 20th century."

Monument

There is a monument to him in Azov, which was dedicated in 1989.

He was a national artist RSFSR (The Russian Socialis Federative Soviet Republic), a corresponding member of academy of arts USSR, winner of state Repin prize. He is from Salsk. The monument was established on 13 September 1989 in the native town of artist. It is an object of cultural legacy and regional importance.

The monument of  Vasiliy  Nechitailo was established in town Salsk at intersection of streets of Lenin and Voroshilov next to Salsk artistic museum  named after him. Authors of the monument are sculptor Vyacheslav Klykov and architect  Vyacheslav Snegiryov. Pedestal of the monument made of granite figure of  Nechitailo cast from bronze. Inscription  “Academician of painting  Vasiliy Kirillovich Nechitailo” was engraved on the pedestal.  It was solemnly opened on 30 September 1989 in celebration of “Day of Salsk”.

References 

1915 births
1980 deaths
Tourist attractions in Rostov Oblast
Soviet artists
Socialist realist artists